The Boy in the Tree is a 1961 Swedish drama film written and directed by Arne Sucksdorff, starring Tomas Bolme, Anders Henrikson, Heinz Hopf and Björn Gustafson. It tells the story of a troubled 16-year-old boy who seeks liberation in nature and teams up with two poachers.

Cast
 Tomas Bolme as Göte
 Heinz Hopf as Max
 Björn Gustafson as Manne
 Anders Henrikson as John Cervin
 Birgitta Pettersson as Marie, Göte's sister
 Åke Lindman as Sten Sundberg, hunter
 Barbro Hiort af Ornäs as Göte's and Marie's mother
 Björn Berglund as Johannes, Göte's and Marie's father
 Karin Juel as Cervin's maid

Release
The film was released in Swedish cinemas on 25 September 1961.

References

1961 drama films
1961 films
Films directed by Arne Sucksdorff
Swedish drama films
1960s Swedish-language films
1960s Swedish films